Deanna Lockett (born 13 November 1995) is an Australian short track speed skater who competed in the 2014 and 2018 Winter Olympics.

Lockett also competed in the 2013 Junior World Championships, winning a bronze medal in the  speed skate. Her combined results gave her an overall 4th place in the event.

In December 2016, Lockett was named to Australia's team for the 2017 Asian Winter Games in Sapporo, Japan.

In May 2019, Lockett earned Hungarian citizenship, and with the start of 2019–2020 season she became part of the Hungarian short-track skating team.

References

External links
 

1995 births
Living people
Australian female short track speed skaters
Olympic short track speed skaters of Australia
People educated at Brisbane State High School
Short track speed skaters at the 2014 Winter Olympics
Short track speed skaters at the 2018 Winter Olympics
Sportspeople from Brisbane
Sportswomen from Queensland
Short track speed skaters at the 2017 Asian Winter Games
21st-century Australian women